Altura may refer to:
Altura (Trieste), a neighbourhood in Trieste, Italy
Altura (Castro Marim), a town and civil parish in the Algarve, Portugal
Altura (Castellón), a municipality in Spain
Altura, Minnesota, a city in the US
Altura, New Jersey, an unincorporated community in the US
Altura Credit Union, a credit union in California, US
Altura, a fictional kingdom in Italo Montemezzi's L'amore dei tre re
Altura (film), a 1949 Italian drama film

See also 
 Alturas (disambiguation)